Saint Anselm College is a private Benedictine liberal arts college in Goffstown, New Hampshire. Founded in 1888, it is the third-oldest Catholic college in New England. Named for Saint Anselm of Canterbury (Archbishop of Canterbury from 1093 to 1109), the college continues to have a fully functioning and independent Benedictine abbey attached to it, Saint Anselm Abbey. As of 2017, its enrollment was approximately 2,000.

According to the college, the student body is selected not only for their academic abilities but also for their personal character. The college's academic curriculum requires several philosophy and theology courses as well as the "Conversatio" program.

Since the 1950s, the college has played a role in the "first in the nation" New Hampshire primary, and has served as the national stage for many future presidents, candidates, and supporters. Presidents John F. Kennedy and Richard Nixon each delivered important policy speeches there. The college has also been home to several national presidential debates.

History 

The first bishop of Manchester, Denis Mary Bradley, invited the Benedictine monks of St. Mary's Abbey in Newark, New Jersey, to form a college and preparatory school in his diocese. The monks that came to Manchester from Saint Mary's were primarily of German descent. This is due to the fact that Manchester was heavily populated with French Canadian and Irish immigrant mill workers, and Bradley was unable to find a suitable religious community that would not stir up ethnic tensions. 

The German monks accepted. They founded the third Catholic college in New England. On August 1, 1889, the New Hampshire legislature approved the incorporation of the Order of Saint Benedict of New Hampshire "for religious and charitable purposes, for the education of youth, for establishing churches and conducting services therein." This historic date marked the founding of Saint Anselm College. A six-year curriculum in philosophy and theology was developed. 

In 1892, as Alumni Hall neared completion, a fire destroyed the college on a cold winter night in February. The fire was most likely caused from an ember from the heating stove's gate as it was not closed properly. Thankfully, no one was seriously hurt because of the fire. The monks were forced to rebuild the college, spending considerably less money on the construction, as they had received only $55,000 from the Insurance Commissioner of the State of New Hampshire. To save money, many bricks were salvaged from the previous structure, and pieces of granite were cut from large granite rocks still visible on the current quad. In 1893, the current building that remains the center of campus was completed; the fire delayed the first academic semester by one year. The monks rebuilt the college, and on October 11, 1893 the college was officially rededicated. To avoid the possibility of another fire, a power house, which today serves as the college print shop, was constructed separately from the building. 

Two years later, in 1895, the New Hampshire legislature granted Saint Anselm College the right to bestow standard academic degrees upon its graduates. In 1912, the bell tower and ivy were added to the building; in 1923, the college's second chapel (the first being located on the second floor at the present-day business office) was constructed as a connecting wing. The second chapel serves today as the Alva deMars Megan Chapel Arts Center.

The Saint Anselm Abbey's shield was designed by Pierre de Chaignon la Rose of Harvard University. It incorporates the personal coat of Anselm of Canterbury and the first seal of New Hampshire. In 1927, by a monastic vote, the shield design was incorporated as the official shield of Saint Anselm Abbey and the college. The drops in each quadrant represent the three drops of blood on Anselm's coat of arms, and the sheaf of five arrows is taken from the first shield of New Hampshire, representing the five original counties of the state. Hence, the Abbey Shield has been interpreted as Saint Anselm of New Hampshire.

One goal of the early college was to be a self-sufficient institution. The farm also included a full vegetable garden which extended from the lawn of Alumni Hall to the current parking lot located between Joan of Arc Hall and Davison Hall. Due to the hard work of the monks and several lay members from the local community, the college was agriculturally independent of the local community. Bonaventure Ostendarp founded the Studio of Christian Art in 1893 in order to sell paintings to local Catholic churches throughout the region. The current Raphael House of the Courts dormitories was the original art studio for the monks, built in 1895.

The Benedictines who established Saint Anselm College founded a preparatory school as well. The preparatory school was a prestigious boarding school for elite men from around New England. In 1935, the monks decided to close the preparatory school to save money for the college's expansion. A notable alum of Saint Anselm Preparatory was Connecticut Senator Thomas J. Dodd.

In 1942, Saint Anselm College became one of the institutions selected by the War Department for training of Army Aviation cadets. Thousands of young men were sent to the college to receive training and education before entering World War II. Cadets trained on large open fields which were located directly behind the present-day Coffee Shop. The US government paid the college for training the cadets, and after the war, the college acquired two prefabricated government buildings which have been transformed into the modern-day coffee shop and bookstore. 

During World War II, several members of the monastic community served as Army chaplains; their names are inscribed on a monument in front of Alumni Hall dedicated to all graduates who have served in the armed forces. Also inscribed on the monument is the Latin and English versions of the Benedictine community's song. For more information see Saint Anselm Abbey Community Song.

During the tumultuous decade of the 1960s, Saint Anselm College had no major disturbances or riots on campus despite various bomb threats called into campus, often from parties outside the college. Fr. Placidus Riley, OSB successfully led the college through these challenging times. Despite the backlash against the US military on college campuses nationwide, the presence of a National Guard armory did not result in any major problems. However, in May 1970, final exams for that year were made optional as students showed support for the students of Kent State after the shootings (several unarmed college students protesting the Vietnam War were killed by the National Guard). Students, faculty and members of the monastic community held prayer services and rallies throughout campus after the Kent State shootings.

The Institute of Saint Anselm Studies was founded in 2000, and the New Hampshire Institute of Politics was founded in 2001.

In 2013, Steven DiSalvo, the former president of Marian University, was named the 10th president of Saint Anselm. DiSalvo replaced Jonathan DeFelice after 24 years of service to the college. Father DeFelice was the longest serving college president in the state of New Hampshire. In 2019, Dr. Joseph A. Favazza, a leader in liberal arts higher education with a longstanding record of success in achieving critical academic and institutional goals, began his tenure as Saint Anselm’s 11th president. 

The monks of Saint Anselm Abbey had the primary responsibility of the day-to-day operation of the college until 2009 when it handed many of those responsibilities to a 20-member board of trustees. A decade later, the monks sued the board over concerns about the college maintaining its Catholic identity. The lawsuit was settled the following year with an agreement that gave the monks responsibility for  the college's mission and vision, with the board in charge of routine operations.

Campus 
Saint Anselm's campus has been noted as one of the most beautiful college campuses in the United States, exemplified by the Princeton Review's number #17 "Most Beautiful Campus" ranking in 2011. The campus is situated in Goffstown, New Hampshire, with a portion of the athletic fields occupying the adjoining town of Bedford. The mailing address for students and faculty is Manchester, New Hampshire. Since 1977, over 40 buildings have been built. The oldest building on campus is Alumni Hall, which was originally constructed in 1891, and rebuilt in 1893 after a fire; at that time, the building was the entire original school.

Alumni Hall 
Alumni Hall was constructed by the Benedictine monks and local contractors from 1891 through the winter of 1892; the building was designed by Patrick W. Ford, an Irish-American architect from Boston. Nearing completion in February 1892, all that remained was for workers to continue to plaster the interior walls; a fire which was most likely caused by a heating stove's gate not closed completely, sparked an ember and destroyed the entire structure. Thankfully, no one was seriously hurt because of the fire. The monks were forced to rebuild the college, spending considerably less money on the construction, as they had only received $55,000 from the Insurance Commissioner of the State of New Hampshire. In an effort to save money, many bricks were salvaged from the previous structure and pieces of granite were cut from large granite rocks still visible on the current quad. In 1893, the current building that remains the center of campus was completed; the fire delayed the first academic semester by one year. To avoid the possibility of another fire, a power house was constructed separately from the building. Farmland complete with livestock, beanpoles and tomato plants lined the present-day quad and adjacent fields, as the monks were completely self-sufficient. In 1912, the bell tower (the inside is pictured to the right) and ivy were added to the building; in 1923, the college's second chapel (the first being located on the second floor at the present-day business office) was constructed as a connecting wing. Today this second chapel is the college's Chapel Arts Center, which hosts art exhibits and other cultural events. It still boasts ornate stained glass windows and painted ceilings.

Today, Alumni Hall houses faculty offices, administrative offices, the Chapel Arts Center, a women's residence hall named "Alumni Streets", or "Streets" for short, and several "smart classrooms". Beneath the Chapel Arts Center is a photography lab, darkroom, and several faculty and student publication offices. Beneath "Streets" and the bell tower are the offices of the Dean of Students, the Registrar's Office, and the Office of Residential Life. Until 1919, the college consisted solely of Alumni Hall. Before this expansion, the monks lived on the second floor and students lived on the third and fourth floors. The first floor and basement had classrooms, a library and cafeteria.

Saint Anselm Abbey Church and monastery 

The Abbey Church is the liturgical center of the college. It is frequently cited as the "heart of campus." The upper church allows the college community to join with the monastic community for the daily celebration of the Eucharist and the Liturgy of the Hours. The lower church permits smaller groups of the community to assemble for worship and houses the Lady Chapel, the Saint Basil Byzantine Chapel, several other side altars, the former offices of Campus Ministry (relocated to the Jean Student Center), and meeting rooms. The Lower Church is the location of the weekly 9 p.m. Mass held on Wednesday nights. The original monastery was Alumni Hall. An interim monastery existed between 1919 and 1955 in what is now Joseph Hall, adjacent to Alumni Hall. The current monastery, built in 1955, is staffed with only a cook, as the monks perform all other tasks such as cleaning, maintenance and upkeep. Having four floors, including a basement, the monastery can house up to one hundred people, both monks and guests on retreat; as of 2019 approximately 30 rooms were filled. Elected in 2012, Abbot Mark Cooper, OSB, has served as the fifth Abbot of Saint Anselm Abbey and the ex officio Chancellor of the College. Male students frequently dine in the monastery as guests; they are required to comply with the Benedictine rule of silence while eating, which allows for contemplation and prayer. The monastery has a refectory, a smaller guest refectory, a smaller chapel, two welcoming rooms near the main entrance and is complete with elevator access to all four floors. The monastery also serves as the mother house for the Woodside Priory School and the abbot serves as the spiritual father for the monks who serve there. Saint Anselm Abbey is a member of the American-Cassinese Congregation of the Benedictine Confederation. Saint Anselm Abbey was founded from Saint Mary's Abbey in Newark, New Jersey.

The abbey and church were both designed by Manchester architects Koehler & Isaak, the former in the conservative Colonial Revival style and the latter in a locally ambitious modernist style. The architects intended the church's exposed masonry and beams to evoke the architecture of the early Catholic church.

Geisel Library 
The library is complete with several reference desks, over 30 computers, and the Institute of Saint Anselm Studies. On the second floor, there are three enclosed study areas; two are group study rooms that are available for student use, and the third is named the Creaghe Room, a locked, faculty-only study.

Geisel Library's collection of over 200,000 books originated in a sack of books brought by Hugo Paff from Saint Mary's Abbey in Newark, New Jersey; these books are still in the library and date back to the mid- to late-19th century. The college's first library, shaped around this initial collection, was situated on the first floor of Alumni Hall. During the early years of the college, Benedictines served as librarians on an ad hoc basis, but by 1929, Saint Anselm had its first official librarian, Cuthbert Redmond. New books were purchased under Edwin Davitt. By 1937, Saint Anselm could boast 8,000 books in several mini-libraries, as well as the main repository, by this time located on the second floor.

The college performed a self-study in 1950 that revealed the need for a larger library. Joseph Geisel, a prominent Manchester businessman, contributed $500,000 in stock, and in 1959 the college broke ground on Geisel Library; the library opened its doors in the fall of 1960. Like the abbey buildings, the library was designed by Koehler & Isaak. The  library featured reading rooms, study areas, a reference center, a music room, seating for 385 students, and space for 100,000 volumes. This original section is the core of the present building.

Performing arts – Dana Center 
The Dana Center for the Humanities is the premier performing arts center on the campus of Saint Anselm College. The center was home to the nationally recognized humanities program, "Portraits of Human Greatness", and is also the headquarters for the student theater group, the Anselmian Abbey Players. The Anselmian Abbey Players have been a center of theater, culture and music on campus for over 60 years. This tradition began in the fall of 1949 with a production of "Career Angel". Since then, this student-run organization has enjoyed a long record of excellence. The Abbey Players offer students the opportunity to develop their artistic talents both on and off the stage, stressing the importance of self-esteem, teamwork, and leadership. The Dana Center also hosts many touring companies throughout the year. These performances include classical theater, contemporary dance, concerts, and films. These performances attract visitors from throughout the region. On stage, international and domestic performers stage both traditional and modern programs ranging from contemporary Indian dance to Piedmont blues to Russian classical music.

The Dana Center has continued to be the site of the presidential debates since 2000.

Residence halls 

34 buildings on campus are devoted to student housing, with approximately 95 percent of the student body living on campus. The majority of freshman males live in Dominic Hall, while most freshman females reside in either Joan of Arc Hall (commonly referred to as JOA) or Baroody Hall.

Joseph Hall 

The campus underwent a substantial facelift in 2009, as new faculty offices and instructional spaces were created within the newly renovated Saint Joan of Arc Convent, which is now known as Joseph Hall. Joseph Hall is named after the third Abbot of Saint Anselm Abbey and former Bishop of Portland, Maine, Bishop Joseph John Gerry. At an estimated cost of $2.5 million, Joseph Hall has a Bloomberg trading room, where business students learn to use a Bloomberg terminal for real-time tracking of financial markets. Constructed in 1919, Joseph Hall served as the first monastery outside of Alumni Hall for over 100 Benedictine monks. In 1955, when the current abbey was built, the Sisters of Saint Joan of Arc, from Quebec, Canada moved in from Bradley House (across campus), and the building was renamed the "Saint Joan of Arc Convent." Their departure in 2008 ended over 50 years of service to the college, as the sisters were cooks, seamstresses and performed other domestic services for the monastic community.

Athletic facilities 

The college opened a $2 million,  fitness center in February 2009. The addition to Carr is a three-story glass center, with floor to ceiling windows overlooking the baseball and football fields, constructed on the south side of the building. The additions brought 37 cardiovascular machines, 39 strength pieces and 7,000 pounds of weights. Connecting to the addition are three indoor basketball/tennis courts equipped with scoreboards and a sound system. The basement of Carr has the varsity gym, football locker room, general locker rooms and administrative offices for the athletic department. In 2012, the college spent 1.3 million dollars by installing a synthetic turf field at Grappone Stadium, and added lights for nighttime practice.

Quad and dormitory 

Construction began on "New Hall" in the summer of 2013. The project was expected to cost over $9.5 million and is situated near the lower entrance of campus in back of Brady Hall. The residence hall, known as the "Living Learning Commons" (LLC), is able to hold 150 students, and has expanded the residential options for undergraduates and should eliminate the need for triple occupancy rooms. The residence hall's common spaces are air-conditioned, while the individual rooms are not. LLC also features student-friendly amenities such as a recycling room, bike storage, general storage space for students, and an elevator.

In 2012, a new parking lot was constructed on college-owned land between Sullivan Arena and privately owned Clarke Farm, located in Bedford. This parking lot has replaced the former Joan of Arc parking lot, which was located between the Dana Center, Davison Dining Hall, and the Joan of Arc residence hall (JOA). The former parking lot was renovated, and the space is now occupied by a grassy quadrangle. A grotto was also built between JOA and Gadbois Hall and was dedicated in late 2014, with the placement of a religious statue. The quadrangle, referred to as the "JOA Quad" or the "Campus Green", has lights and walkways and is lined with trees; the centerpiece is a brick patio with a large, granite seal of the college.

Environmental responsibility 

Saint Anselm College RECYCLES was a greening movement which started on campus in 2009. Up to that time, recycling was limited on campus, and students had to resort to their own methods of recycling containers and other recyclables in dorms. An impromptu recycling program — Saint Anselm College RECYCLES — was started through the Knights of Columbus and the Club Soccer organization that served the Uppers section of campus, every Saturday, averaging around 650 pounds of material per week. In the 2010 spring semester, this plan funded by Club Soccer and the Knights of Columbus provided over fifty recycle bins, purchased from the city of Providence, Rhode Island. In the spring of 2010, the New Hampshire Institute of Politics installed seven recycling bins throughout its facilities. Inspired by this student-led activity, the college's physical plant purchased 120 bins for all of the apartments in the Uppers, Lowers and Falvey and Collins Houses. In the fall of 2010, Physical Plant installed five Waste Management recycling dumpsters throughout campus. Campus-wide recycling is planned by 2013.

Academics 
Saint Anselm used to require the completion of a nationally recognized two-year Humanities program. The "Portraits of Human Greatness" program began freshman year and would end at the completion of a student's sophomore year. Seeking to develop a well-rounded student, the college replaced the program with the "Conversatio" lecture series. However, this has caused significant outcry from some alumni, charging that this "new humanities program" is too watered down. After the addition of "Conversatio" in 2014, the number of classes taken by full-time students dropped from 5 classes to 4 classes per semester, with the credit hours of each class increasing. By studying the humanities, comprising art, science, literature, philosophy, and theology, faculty and students attempt to understand profound issues, specifically focusing on the human condition. In addition, three philosophy and three theology courses are required in order for a student to graduate. Two out of the three required courses for philosophy are "Nature and the Human Person", which details the philosophy and psyche of the human being; "Ethics", which discusses issues ranging from medical to sexual ethics; and an elective of the student's choosing. One of the required theology courses is "Biblical Theology", which is an overview of the Old and New Testaments of the Bible.

While the college does not have an established "Honor Code", there is a "faith based honor code", which requires students to remain faithful to the college's mission, faith and identity.

Anti-grade inflation policy 

Saint Anselm College has resisted what the college sees as the grade inflation trend at many of America's colleges and universities. At Saint Anselm, the top 25 percent of the class has a 3.1 grade point average (GPA); the median grade at the college is around a 2.5 GPA. While the Dean's List at most schools begin at a 3.5 GPA, Saint Anselm awards students with the honor at a 3.4 GPA. According to a 2006 Fox News article, former Dean of the college Fr. Peter Guerin, OSB is quoted as saying that today's "parents may view universities as a consumer market in which they're in a way paying for the diploma. ... Students who attend class on a regular basis and are paying tuition feel that they should be receiving that A, even if they have not deserved it." Some professors and administrators believe that inflating grades makes it harder for students to realize their academic strengths and weaknesses and may encourage students to take classes based on grade expectations. The practice also makes it harder for parents and students to determine whether or not the grade was earned. A curriculum committee was set up in 1980 to meet with the academic dean and review the grading policies on a monthly basis. The previous president of the college, Fr. Jonathan DeFelice, is quoted as saying, "I cannot speak for everyone, but if I'm headed for the operating room, I will take the surgeon who earned his or her 'A' the honest way".

Admissions profile 
The majority of the applicant pool is from the New England area. Saint Anselm College accepts 77% of all applicants. The selection process is composed of a comprehensive review of the applicant's high school transcript, personal recommendations from teachers and guidance counselor, an essay, and extracurricular involvement. As of 2010, SAT/ACT scores are optional for applicants. The college's applicant pool is relatively small, and the retention rate of Saint Anselm students from freshman to sophomore year is 76 percent. The average accepted high school GPA is a 3.2 on a scale of 4.

Rankings 

Saint Anselm College is ranked #102 in National Liberal Arts Colleges, #90 in Best Value Schools, and #126 in Top Performers on Social Mobility, according to U.S. News & World Report.  In 2015, Saint Anselm was recognized by Time magazine as one of the "50 Best Liberal Arts Colleges" in the nation. St. Anselm was ranked #18 among liberal arts colleges in the country for the best return on investment (ROI) according to "Payscale.com". In the same vein, the College was named #171 by The Economist's ranking of over 1,000 colleges, for best economic value. U.S. News & World Reports 2016 college rankings ranked Saint Anselm #112 in the nation. Saint Anselm College is accredited by the New England Commission of Higher Education.

Recently, Saint Anselm was listed #100 among national liberal arts institutions that Kiplinger's judged as offering the best value. The Princeton Review's Best 373 Colleges publication has described Saint Anselm as "one of the country's best institutions for undergraduate education." The Princeton Review describes the college as academically challenging, but rewarding, with "passionate professors" who make time to work individually with students. The college was ranked #10 in the nation for the quality of food in The Princeton Review's 2015 rating.

Faculty 
Saint Anselm has a student-faculty ratio of 11:1 and an average class size of 18 students. Saint Anselm does not have teaching assistants or graduate assistants. Saint Anselm has 145 full-time faculty and 62 part-time instructors; almost all faculty members (90 percent) have terminal degrees in their respective fields.

Majors and minors 

Saint Anselm College offers majors in 32 subject areas. In addition to the one major required for graduation, students can also pursue as many minors as their course schedule allows.

Special academic programs 

Some majors and minors offer special academic programs. Completion of these programs does not result in any minor or other recognition. If a student wishes to enter a professional school after graduation, he or she may undertake one of the pre-professional programs offered.

Pre-professional programs include Pre-Law, Pre-Medicine/Pre-Dental/Pre-Veterinary, and Pre-Theology. Starting freshman year, students are paired up with advisors who will help the student decide which courses to take and offer general guidance throughout their time at Saint Anselm. However, pre-professional students often complain about the quality of their advisors, as they are often labelled as inexperienced, and many students choose to side step the process entirely. The program culminates with a "pre-professional interview" where three professors hold a mock professional interview with a student.

Internships – Students from virtually every major participate in internships; examples range from investment firms on Wall Street to the Massachusetts General Hospital.

Archaeological excavation – The Classics Department sponsors an excavation at Castel Viscardo, a city near Orvieto in Italy. Faculty and students from the college are excavating a site that was occupied from the early Etruscan to the late Roman periods. The excavation have yielded many historical and archaeological finds; Saint Anselm College sends over 25 students each summer to the Coriglia excavation, just outside town.

The Cooperative Engineering Program is a five-year cooperative liberal arts and engineering program in affiliation with the University of Notre Dame, the University of Massachusetts Lowell, The Catholic University of America, and Manhattan College in Riverdale, New York. Three years are spent fulfilling undergraduate liberal arts courses at Saint Anselm, and two years are spent at one of the universities above for an engineering degree.

Honor societies 

Saint Anselm College participates in the following national and international honor societies. Invitations from these societies are organized through each academic department, as students are usually invited membership by junior or senior year.

Delta Epsilon Sigma, the Catholic equivalent to Phi Beta Kappa, is the oldest honor society at the college. Open to all majors, the Tau Chapter, founded in 1940, accepts only 40 members from the senior and junior classes.

Other societies include the debate honor society Delta Sigma Rho, international social science honor society Pi Gamma Mu, history honor society Phi Alpha Theta, economics honor society Omicron Delta Epsilon, nursing honor society Sigma Theta Tau, Spanish language honor society Sigma Delta Pi, French honor society Pi Delta Phi, psychology honor society Psi Chi, politics honor society Pi Sigma Alpha, biology honor society Beta Beta Beta, and physics honor society Sigma Pi Sigma. The Dean's List of Scholars is an internal honor society accepting students that fulfill its requirements of a 3.4 semester GPA in at least four classes. Only the top 25 percent of the school generally qualifies for the list. Members receive a card of congratulations, signed by the Dean of the college.

Accreditation and memberships 
Saint Anselm College is accredited by the New England Association of Schools and Colleges. It holds membership in the Association of American Colleges and Universities, the American Council on Education, the National Catholic Educational Association, the National Association of Independent Colleges and Universities, and the New Hampshire College & University Council. Saint Anselm is a member of the Association of Benedictine Colleges and Universities, as Father Jonathan DeFelice was a co-founder of this organization in 1993. Saint Anselm is on the approved list of the American Chemical Society and of the New Hampshire State Board of Education for teacher training. The baccalaureate program in nursing is fully accredited by the Commission on Collegiate Nursing Education and fully approved by the New Hampshire Board of Nursing. The Department of Nursing is a member of the American Association of Colleges of Nursing, the Commission on Collegiate Nursing Education, the Council of Baccalaureate and Higher Degree Programs of the National League for Nursing and the Nightingale Society. The Continuing Nursing Education program is accredited as a provider of continuing nursing education by the American Nurses Credentialing Center's Commission on Accreditation.

New Hampshire Institute of Politics 

Marc Ambinder, political editor of The Atlantic, described the role Saint Anselm plays in national politics by saying, "no one runs for president without speaking at St. A's New Hampshire Institute of Politics." U.S. News & World Report also ranked the college as the single, most popular location in New Hampshire for presidential candidates to visit. For over the past forty years, the New Hampshire Institute of Politics (NHIOP) has played host to hundreds of presidential aspirants that have delivered policy speeches at Saint Anselm College. It was founded on the basis that "educated and engaged citizens are vital for a healthy democracy." The NHIOP houses the Politics department, as well as providing classroom space for use by all departments. The institute is credited with raising the national profile of the college by incorporating the college in the New Hampshire primary, the first primary of the United States presidential election.

Meelia Center for Community Engagement 
The Meelia Center is one of the many outlets available for students to volunteer in the Greater Manchester community. Since 1989, the Meelia Center has allowed Saint Anselm College students to mobilize their talents and energies to assist 14 community partnerships and more than 30 other community service agencies throughout New Hampshire. Annually, some 850 students, faculty, and staff volunteer more than 16,000 community service hours. The Princeton Review has described the Meelia Center as "the nerve center of Saint Anselm's bustling service community", adding that "the center, according to the school, 'employs nearly sixty student service leaders, who in turn recruit, place, and support over 200 volunteers and 210 service learners each semester who perform weekly service in over thirty community agencies. An additional 350 volunteers serve in occasional one-day service events. In 2010, the Meelia Center alone accounted for the coordination of 20,000 service hours by Saint Anselm students. New students are introduced to the service commitment through the New Student Day of Service. As part of freshman orientation, students are sent in teams of thirty to partnership sites and other community non-profit agencies. Upperclassmen work throughout the summer to organize these orientation events that involve anywhere from fifteen to twenty sites around New Hampshire.

Athletics 

Saint Anselm College competes at the NCAA Division II level in 23 men's and women's varsity sports. The college offers baseball, basketball, cross country, football, golf, ice hockey, lacrosse, skiing, soccer, tennis, field hockey, volleyball, track & field, bowling and softball programs open to all students. Saint Anselm's sports teams are known as the Hawks; their colors are blue and white. The Hawks participate as a member of the Northeast 10 in most sports. In women's ice hockey and women’s bowling, the Hawks compete as de facto NCAA Division I programs in the New England Women's Hockey Alliance and the East Coast Conference, respectively.

Student organizations 
Student organizations on campus include arts & culture organizations, performance groups, sports groups, political organizations, religious organizations, and social action groups. Clubs on campus include The Knights of Columbus, Alpha Phi Omega, Abbey Players, Campus Activities Board, Classics Society, The History Society, Democrats, Republicans, Green Team, Italian Club, Dance Club, Muslim Student Association, Jazz Band, Organization for Life, Mock Trial, Psychology Club, and Yearbook Club. One example of college organizations playing an active role in the local community is the Saint Anselm College Knights of Columbus, Council 4785 in Manchester, New Hampshire who were awarded the 2009–2010 National Community Activity Award for creating a comprehensive recycling program at the New Hampshire State Prison for Women. The Campus Activities Board (CAB), a student-run organization, runs several committees that oversee campus-wide activities and student services. In 2008, CAB organized singer Howie Day, in 2009, the band Third Eye Blind performed at the college. Jason Derulo and Matt Nathanson performed there in 2010. More recent acts have included Marc E. Bassy and Jesse McCartney.

Student publications 
The Saint Anselm Crier, founded in the early 1960s as The Anselmian Crier is the student newspaper of Saint Anselm College. It is published twice monthly when school is in session. The Crier won the 2008–2009 First Place Scholastic Newspaper Award from the American Scholastic Press Association. In 2009, The Saint Anselm Crier adopted new terminology designating the publication as the "independent" student newspaper instead of the "official" student newspaper of Saint Anselm College. This was done to separate student opinion from official college news released by Saint Anselm's public relations department.

The Hilltop, founded in 2009, was an independent student newsletter. It was published bi-weekly, and sought to provide substance over entertainment and integrity over controversy, as some students had supported this publication over the Crier. claiming the latter's quality had deteriorated. In the Fall of 2010, The Hilltop merged with The Saint Anselm Crier after an agreement was made at the urging of the Crier's advisor, Fr. Jerome Day, OSB, who claimed that the college was not large enough for two student newspapers. The Hilltop's staff agreed to become part of the Crier staff and The Saint Anselm Crier promised to refocus on its quality, including a page called "The Hilltop" devoted to substantial issues.

The Saint Anselm Whiner, founded in February 2010, was an underground joke newspaper independently published by a group of anonymous students. It was published bi-weekly. The Whiner parodies The Crier and The Hilltop and lampoons various Saint Anselm College issues. The motto of the Saint Anselm Whiner was "Unreliability You Can Count On."

The Quatrain, published annually by a small group of students with the help of the English Department and the printing office, is a collection of students' poetry, short stories, and artwork (photographic and otherwise) that is collected via submissions over the course of the academic year and is freely distributed to the student population near the end of the second semester.

The Shank, published each semester, is the History Department's journal consisting exclusively of students' work. The journal is open to all students regardless of their major, as long as the paper submitted was written in a history class.

Lucubrations is the cultural magazine for the Saint Anselm Community. It publishes all forms of creative content including art, music, photography, literature, poetry, philosophy, commentary, and video from students, faculty, staff, and alumni of the college. It was founded in 2009 by student Dana Nolan (Class of 2011). It is published online. Submissions are published on an ongoing basis and also collected into digest issues two times a semester, for four issues per academic year. The word lucubrations is based on the Latin word lucubrare and means study by candlelight, nocturnal study or meditation, and the writings or thoughts that result.

Notable alumni 

L. A. "Skip" Bafalis (b. 1929), member of the United States House of Representatives from Florida's 10th congressional district, 1973 to 1983 (1952)
King Banaian (b. 1957), Minnesota state representative1979
Harvey C. "Barney" Barnum (b. 1940), Medal of Honor recipient (Vietnam)(1962)
William J. Baroody Sr. (1916–1980), president of American Enterprise Institute, and appointed chairman of the Woodrow Wilson International Center for Scholars by President Richard Nixon(1936)
Keith Beauregard (b. 1983), American baseball coach
Michael Buckley (b. 1975), YouTube celebrity host of the "WhattheBuck!?" show(1997)
Vincent Colapietro, Ph.D., philosophy professor at Pennsylvania State University, author of many published articles and several published books(1973)
Sharon Dawley (b. 1961), head coach of the University of Massachusetts Amherst women's basketball team(1979)
Thomas J. Dodd (1907–1971), U.S. senator from Connecticut; influential force at the Nuremberg Trials(1926)
Aaron Frey (c. 1978), Attorney General of Maine and former Maine state representative(2001)
Bill Gannon (b. 1962), New Hampshire state senator and former state representative (1984)
Joseph John Gerry (b. 1928), former Bishop of Portland, Maine, and former Abbot of Saint Anselm Abbey(1950)
Stephanie Gould (b.1984), actress, Orange is the New Black, The Marvelous Mrs. Maisel(2007)
Robert W. Heagney – 1975, Connecticut state representative
Msgr. Wilfrid Paradis – 1943, priest of the Diocese of Manchester, NH, expert at the Second Vatican Council, recipient of the US Army Silver Star
Daniel T. K. Hurley (b. 1943), lawyer and judge, serving on the United States District Court for the Southern District of Florida(1964)
Tim Karalexis (b. 1980), professional soccer player in the USL First Division(2001)
Gérald Lacroix (b. 1957), Roman Catholic cardinal, Archbishop of Quebec and Primate of Canada
Martin F. Loughlin (1923–2007), lawyer and judge, served on the United States District Court for the District of New Hampshire(1947)
William C. Martel (1955–2015), Associate Professor of International Security Studies at the Fletcher School, Tufts University
Hubie McDonough (b. 1963), NHL player for the Los Angeles Kings, San Jose Sharks and the New York Islanders(1986)
Ray "Scooter" McLean (1915–1964), NFL player for the Chicago Bears and coach of the Green Bay Packers(1940)
Henry J. Meade (1925–2006), Chief of Chaplains of the U.S. Air Force(1951)
Ralph Mollis (b. 1961), former Secretary of State of Rhode Island(1978)
Rómulo O'Farril (1917–2006), multi-millionaire Mexican businessman; founder of Televisa in Mexico City(1937)
Joseph Rummel (1876–1964), Archbishop of New Orleans and civil rights activist who desegregated New Orleans Catholic Schools in 1962 (1896)
Mark J. Sullivan, former director of United States Secret Service(1977)
Rob Surette (b. 1971), public motivational speaker and speed painter(1993)
 Matthew Szulik, former chief executive officer and president of the S&P 500 Red Hat software company; 2010 chairman of the Science and Technology Board for the state of North Carolina's Economic Development Board(1978)

Notable faculty 
Jason Sorens (b. 1976), Director of the Center for Ethics in Society at Saint Anselm College; quantitative political scientist, nonprofit administrator; founder of the Free State Project

References

External links 

 
 Saint Anselm Athletics website

 
1889 establishments in New Hampshire
Benedictine colleges and universities
Educational institutions established in 1889
Goffstown, New Hampshire
Liberal arts colleges in New Hampshire
Roman Catholic Diocese of Manchester
Catholic universities and colleges in New Hampshire